David Victor Canter (born 5 January 1944) is a psychologist. He began his career as an architectural psychologist studying the interactions between people and buildings, publishing and providing consultancy on the designs of offices, schools, prisons, housing and other building forms as well as exploring how people made sense of the large scale environment, notably cities. He set up the Journal of Environmental Psychology in 1980. His work in architecture led to studies of human reactions in fires and other emergencies. He wrote about investigative psychology in Britain. He helped police in 1985 on the Railway Rapist case. He was the professor of psychology at the University of Surrey for ten years, where he developed investigative psychology described in detail in Investigative Psychology: Offender Profiling and the Analysis of Criminal Action and a course curriculum. He set up and was director of the Centre For Investigative Psychology, which is based at the University of Liverpool. From 2009 he was at the University of Huddersfield, where he directed the International Research Centre in Investigative Psychology. He retired from there in 2018. He is emeritus professor at the University of Liverpool and continues to publish in environmental and crime/forensic psychology.

Books

The Study of Meaning in Architecture (1968) Publisher: D.V. Canter
Scales for the Evaluation of Buildings (1971) Strathclyde University
People and Buildings: A Brief Overview of Research (1972) Council of Planning Librarians
Psychology for Architects  (1974) London: Applied Science  
The Psychology of Place (1977) Architectural Press 
Studies of Human Behavior in Fire: Empirical Results and Their Implications for Education and Design (1983) University of Surrey
Criminal Shadows: Inside the Mind of the Serial Killer (1994) Harper-Collins (won 1995 Anthony Award for Best True Crime book)(won 1994 Golden Dagger award for True Crime)
Criminal Shadows – Inner Narratives of Evil (2000, Paperback) Authorlink 
Psychology in Action (1996) Dartmouth 
Mapping Murder: The Secrets of Geographical Profiling (2003) Virgin Books. 
Criminal Psychology: Topics in Applied Psychology (Topics Applied Psychology) (27 June 2008) Hodder Arnold 
The Faces of Terrorism: Multidisciplinary Perspectives. Cross-disciplinary Explorations (ed.) (2009) WileyBlackwell 
Forensic Psychology: A very short introduction (2010) Oxford University Press  (also translated into Egyptian)
Forensic Psychology for Dummies (2012) John Wiley and Sons Ltd (ebk)

Collaborations
Architectural Psychology (ed.) (1970)
Psychology and the Built Environment (1974) (ed. with Terence Lee.) 
Environmental Interaction: Psychological Approaches to Our Physical Surroundings  (1975) (ed. with P. Stringer) 
Designing for Therapeutic Environments: A Review of Research (ed. with S. Canter) (1979)
Psychology in Practice: Perspectives on Professional Psychology (ed. with S. Canter) (1982)
Facet Theory: Approaches to Social Research (ed.) (1985)
The Research Interview: Uses and Approaches (ed. M. Brenner and J. Brown) (1985)
Environmental Social Psychology (ed. with J.C. Jesuino, L. Soczka and G.M. Stephenson) (1988)
Environmental Perspectives (ed. with M. Krampen and D. Stea) (1988)
Environmental Policy, Assessment and Communication (ed. with M. Krampen and D. Stea) (1988)
New Directions in Environmental Participation (ed. with M. Krampen and D. Stea) (1988)
Football in its Place: An Environmental Psychology of Football Grounds (with Miriam Comber and David L. Uzzell) (1989). Introduction by Sir Oliver Popplewell. Taylor & Francis. 
Fires and Human Behaviour (ed.) (1990) Fulton 
Empirical Approaches to Social Representations (1993); with Breakwell, Glynis. Oxford University Press. 
Criminal Detection and the Psychology of Crime (1997); with Alison, Laurence. Aldershot: Ashgate/Dartmouth. 
Interviewing and Deception – Offender Profiling Series, Vol. I (1998); with Alison, Laurence. Aldershot: Ashgate. 
Profiling in Policy and Practice – Offender Profiling Series, Vol. II (1999); with Alison, Laurence. Aldershot: Ashgate. 
The Social Psychology of Crime: Groups, Teams and Networks – Offender Profiling Series, Vol. III (2000); with Alison, Laurence. Aldershot: Ashgate. 
Profiling Property Crime – Offender Profiling Series, Vol. IV (2000); with Alison, Laurence. Alderhost: Ashgate. 
Profiling Rape and Murder – Offender Profiling Series, Vol. V (2008); with Alison, Laurence. Alderhost: Ashgate. 
Profiling: Principles, Processes, Practicalities (2008); with Keppel, Robert. London: Prentice Hall. 
Psychology and Law: Bridging the Gap (Psychology, Crime and Law) (Ed.) (2008); with Zukauskiene, Rita (Ed.). Ashgate 
Environmental Psychology; with Bonnes, Mirilia and Hartig, Terry. (28 April 2008) Ashgate 
The Investigative Psychology of Serial Killing; with Youngs, Donna. (28 September 2008) Ashgate 
Investigative Psychology: Offender Profiling and the Analysis of Criminal Action (3 October 2008, Paperback); with Youngs, Donna. John Wiley and Sons. 
Becoming an Author: Advice for Academics and Professionals (2006); with Fairbairn, Gavin. Open University Press 
Biologising the Social Sciences: Challenging Darwininan and Neuroscience Explanations (2014); with Turner, David (Ed.) Routledge

References

External links 
Official web site
 Crimelibrary.com

1944 births
Living people
Academics of the University of Surrey
Anthony Award winners
British criminologists
Forensic psychologists
Offender profiling
People associated with The Institute for Cultural Research